The Seymour Church House is a historic residence located north of Winterset, Iowa, United States.  Samuel Stover originally acquired  of land in 1854, and it includes the property the house was built on.  The property was transferred to Matilda Stover before Seymour Church acquired it.  The house is an early example of a vernacular limestone farmhouse.  It is sited on the side of a hill south of the road and facing a stream.  The north elevation reveals only the second floor, while the south side reveals it to be a 2½-story house.  It is composed of locally quarried finished cut and rubble limestone. The house was listed on the National Register of Historic Places in 1987.

References

Houses completed in 1865
Vernacular architecture in Iowa
Houses in Madison County, Iowa
National Register of Historic Places in Madison County, Iowa
Houses on the National Register of Historic Places in Iowa